Razakar , literally "volunteer") was an East Pakistani paramilitary force organised by General Tikka Khan in then East Pakistan, now called Bangladesh, during the Bangladesh Liberation War in 1971. Since the 1971 war, it has become a pejorative term (implying traitor) in Bangladesh due to the atrocities allegedly committed by the Razakars during the War. The Razakar force was composed of mostly anti-Bangladesh and pro-Pakistan Bengalis and Urdu-speaking migrants who lived in Bangladesh at the time.

Creation
The East Pakistan Razakars Ordinance was promulgated on 2 August 1971 by the Governor of East Pakistan, Lieutenant General Tikka Khan. The Ordinance stipulated the creation of a voluntary force to be trained and equipped by the Provincial Government. This was to add to the government's forces to suppress the rebellion of people who wanted independence for the region. It is also alleged that Razakars were recruited by the Shanti Committee, which was formed by several pro-Pakistani leaders including Nurul Amin, Ghulam Azam and Khwaja Khairuddin. The first recruits included 96 Jamaat party members, who started training in an Ansar camp at Khan Jahan Ali Road, Khulna.

During the 1971 Bangladesh genocide by the Pakistani Army and its supporting militias (Razakar) killed an estimated 300,000 to 3,000,000 people, and raped 200,000–400,000 Bangladeshi women in a systematic campaign of genocidal rape.

Organisation
The Razakars had two branches they were Al-Badr and Al-Shams paramilitary forces. Students from Madrasahs were inducted into Al-Badr for specialised operations while Al-Shams was tasked with protection of important strategic locations. The Razakar were under Pakistani Army command and also trained by them (see external link section). In September 1971, the Razakar force was placed under the command of Major General Mohammed Jamshed. Organisational command of the Razakar was given to Abdur Rahim.

The Razakar force was organised into brigades of around 3000–4000 volunteers, mainly armed with light Infantry weapons provided by the Pakistan Army. Each Razakar Brigade was attached as an auxiliary to two Pakistani Regular Army Brigades, and their main function was to arrest and detain nationalist Bengali suspects. Suspects were tortured during custody and killed. The Razakars were trained by the Pakistan Army. While formed as a paramilitary group, the Razakars also served as local guides for the Pakistan Army. Both organisations were later accused of having violated Geneva Conventions of War by raping, murdering and looting the locals. Razakars also allegedly killed Indian civilians during the war. On 5 August 1971, six Indians were killed by the Razakars in Panti village under Kumarkhali sub-division. They killed 3 Indians in Sylhet and 19 Indians in Jessore, Gopalganj and Chittagong hill tracts.

Quoting a declassified US document Azadur Rahman Chandan wrote, "the 'Rasikars' are a destabilizing element – living off the land, able to make life and death decisions by denouncing collaborators and openly pillaging and terrorizing villagers without apparent restraint from the Army".

The Razakars were paid by the Pakistan Army and Provincial Government. Leading supporters of a united Pakistan urged General Yahya Khan to increase the number of Razakars and given them more arms to extend their activities in East Pakistan.

Towards the end of 1971, increasing numbers of Razakars were deserting, as the end of the war approached and Bangladesh moved towards independence.

Dissolution
Following the surrender of the East Pakistani troops on 16 December 1971 and the proclamation of independence of Bangladesh, the Razakar units were dissolved. The Jamaat party was banned, as it had opposed independence. Many leading Razakars fled to Pakistan (previously West Pakistan).

Waves of violence followed the official end of the war, and some lower-ranking Razakars were killed in reprisals by Mukti Bahini militia. The government rounded up and imprisoned an estimated 36,000 men suspected of being Razakars. The government ultimately freed many of those held in jail, both in response to pressure from the United States and China, who backed Pakistan in the war, and to gain co-operation from Pakistan in obtaining the release of 200,000 Bengali-speaking military and civilian personnel who had been stranded or imprisoned in West Pakistan during the war.

In Bangladesh today, razakar is used as a pejorative term meaning "traitor" or Judas.

Trials 
In 2010 the Bangladesh government, led by the Awami League, set up an International Crimes Tribunal based on the International Crimes Tribunal Act 1973 to prosecute the people who committed war crimes and crimes against humanities during the liberation war in 1971. People of Pakistan who were not aware of their crimes due to censorship by Yahya regime , have now openly welcome their trials and even support their public execution. 

Several trials were concluded in early 2013: Abul Kalam Azad was convicted of eight charges and sentenced to death in January 2013. Abdul Quader Mollah was convicted of five of six charges and sentenced to death in December 2013. Delwar Hossain Sayeedi, the Nayeb-e-Ameer of Jamaat, was convicted of eight charges of war crimes and sentenced to death for two of them in February 2013. However, the trial process has been termed as "politically motivated" by its critics, while the human rights groups recognised the tribunal as falling short of international standards.

List of war crimes 

The Razakar forces violated Geneva Conventions of War by killing, raping, murdering and looting the Civilians.

Notable confirmed Razakar members
 AKM Yusuf, the lead organiser.
 Forkan Mallik, a Razakar commander, convicted of rapes and forceful conversions in Mirzaganj, Patuakhali.

On 16 December 2019, the Government of Bangladesh published the names of 10,789 Razakars who collaborated with Pakistan's Army in carrying out atrocities against the Bengalis during the 1971 Liberation War.

See also
 International Crimes Tribunal Timeline
 Timeline of the Bangladesh War
 1971 killing of Bengali intellectuals
 1971 Dhaka University massacre
 Shankharipara massacre
 1970 Bhola cyclone

References

Further reading
 Chandan, Azadur Rahman (February 2011) [2009]. একাত্তরের ঘাতক ও দালালরা [The Killers and Collaborators of 71] (Revised 2nd ed.). Dhaka: Jatiya Sahitya Prakash. pp. 48–54.
 volunteers and Collaborators of 1971: An Account of Their Whereabouts, compiled and published by the Center for the Development of the Spirit of the Liberation War.

External links
  Razakars in training watched by Amir Abdullah Khan Niazi
 Razakars complete their training

Bangladesh Liberation War
Political slurs for people
Former paramilitary forces of Pakistan